Siddharth Kumar Tewary( born 5 December 1958) is an Indian television producer and director. He is the founder of Swastik Productions, one of India's largest production house. Currently, he serves as the company's chief Creative Director. Tewary has been the creator and director of various shows like Mahabharat (Star Plus), Suryaputra Karn, Karmaphal Daata Shani (Colors TV), Porus (SET India), Ram Siya Ke Luv Kush and most recently RadhaKrishn (Star Bharat). He made his first OTT debut with Escaype Live starring Siddharth for Disney+ Hotstar in 2022.

Early life
Tewary was raised in a middle class Brahmin family in Kolkata. He studied at St. Xavier’s Collegiate School and the St. Xavier's College,  at the University of Calcutta in Kolkata and subsequently studied Mass Communication at the Symbiosis Institute of Media and Communication in Pune.

Notable TV shows

Mahabharat 
Mahabharat was the adaptation of the Sanskrit epic of the same name, which depicted the rivalry of the cousins Kauravas and Pandavas of the Kuru Dynasty which ultimately led to the Kurukshetra War. The show aired from 16 September 2013 to 16 August 2014 on Star Plus. It was India's most expensive series with a total budget of INR 100 crores. The show received huge critical and audience acclaim which helped the broadcasting channel Star Plus clock the highest GTVMs ever achieved by any channel in Indian Television History.

Porus 
Porus was the story of 2 Kings, Porus (King of Pauravas) and Alexander The Great ( King of Macedonia) and how their fates brought them face-to-face in the Battle of Hydaspes. The show aired from 27 November 2017 to 13 November 2018 on SET India. It was India's most expensive series with a budget of INR 500 crores(USD 70 million). It became India's first Global-TV series and also first Indian series to reach Japan. It has been dubbed and subbed in many languages and is already sold to over 11 countries and 14 territories.

RadhaKrishn 
RadhaKrishn was Hindu mythological television drama series that was premiered on 1 October 2018 on Star Bharat and is also digitally available on Disney+ Hotstar. The series is based on the life of Hindu deities Radha and Krishna and it has three chapters.
 Chapter 1 : Radha-Krishna's teenage
 Chapter 2 : Mahabharata
 Chapter 3 : Punarmilan

Filmography

Television series

Web series

Former productions 
 Navya
 Razia Sultan
 Mahabharat
 Suryaputra Karn
 Karmaphal Daata Shani
 Mahakali — Anth Hi Aarambh Hai
 Porus
 Chandragupt Maurya
 Ram Siya Ke Luv Kush
 Devi Adi Parashakti
 Shankar Jaikishan 3 in 1 on SAB TV
 Deva Shree Ganesha on Star Pravah

References

External links

 

Living people
University of Calcutta alumni
Year of birth missing (living people)
Indian television directors
Indian television producers
St. Xavier's College, Kolkata alumni
Indian company founders